Oldbury was the terminal station on the Great Western Railway's, half mile (0.8 km) long, Oldbury branch running from Langley Green railway station.

History 
Oldbury was the second railway station to be opened in the town of Oldbury, in the West Midlands, England. The first railway station was Oldbury and Bromford Lane. This station is still in use and was later renamed to Sandwell and Dudley. However, Oldbury station was nearer to the town centre.

Oldbury station closed on 3 March 1915. The branch line remained open to provide goods facilities to local factories; however, the northern extremity of the line was severed in the late 1960s, by the construction of the M5 Motorway.

References

Railway stations in Great Britain opened in 1885
Railway stations in Great Britain closed in 1915
Disused railway stations in Sandwell
Oldbury, West Midlands
Former Great Western Railway stations